Jikoi Kida (born 21 November 1980) is a Fijian cricketer. He played in the 2015 ICC World Cricket League Division Six tournament.

In August 2018, he was named in Fiji's squad for Group A of the 2018–19 ICC World Twenty20 East Asia-Pacific Qualifier tournament. He was the joint-leading wicket-taker for Fiji in the tournament, with seven dismissals in four matches.

References

External links
 

1980 births
Living people
Fijian cricketers
Place of birth missing (living people)